Second Bureau (French: Deuxième bureau) is a 1935 French spy romance film directed by Pierre Billon and starring Jean Murat, Véra Korène and Janine Crispin. It is based on the novel Second Bureau by Charles Robert-Dumas. The following year it was remade as a British film by Victor Hanbury. The book was one of a spy series Ceux du S. R. published in France by Librarie Arthème Fayard in 1934. The film's sets were designed by the art director Aimé Bazin.

Capitaine Benoit of the French secret service manages to steal the plans of Germany's new fighter plane. German intelligence assigns one of their top female agents to recover the stolen designs.

Partial cast
 Jean Murat as Capitaine Benoit  
 Véra Korène as L'Espionne Erna Flieder  
 Janine Crispin as Dorothee  
 Jean-Max as Comte Brusilot 
 Pierre Alcover as Weygelmann  
 Pierre Magnier as Colonel Guerraud  
 Georges Prieur as General Von Raugwitz  
 Geno Ferny as L'Aubergiste  
 Pierre Larquey as Asjundant Colleret  
 Jean Galland as Lieutenant Van Strammer  
 Andrée Moreau as Nageberger  
 Henry Bonvallet as Schaffingen

Critical reception
Writing for The Spectator in 1936, Graham Greene characterized the film as "a rather dull film, [and as] a long packed melodrama". With the exception of the "sinister and satiric" first scene that was described as "brilliant", Greene took the view that on the whole "the film is too thick with drama". Taking issue with the film's genre, Greene suggests that satire and realism would have been more effective in handling the picture's themes.

References

Bibliography
Low, Rachael. Filmmaking in 1930s Britain. George Allen & Unwin, 1985.

External links

BnF archival documents relating to the film 

1935 films
French spy films
French romance films
French black-and-white films
1930s spy films
1930s romance films
1930s French-language films
Films directed by Pierre Billon
Films based on French novels
Spy romance films
1930s French films